The Jump Up! Tour was a worldwide concert tour by English musician and composer Elton John, in support of his 16th studio album 
Jump Up!. The tour included five legs (Australia, Europe, North America, UK and South Africa) and a total of 135 shows.

Tour

On 10 March 1982, the Athletic Park in Wellington was the site of Davey Johnstone’s return to the Elton John band, reuniting the classic band on stage for the first time in eight years.

Elton John, Davey Johnstone, Dee Murray and Nigel Olsson then took the Jump Up! Tour across Australia and Europe (and blasting through New York on 17 April with a powerful performance of "Empty Garden" and "Ball And Chain" on Saturday Night Live) before launching their North American tour on 12 June at the Red Rocks Amphitheatre in Colorado. The 7 July show in Kansas City, Missouri, was broadcast live on nationwide radio, and this leg of the tour ended after three nights at Madison Square Garden on 7 August 1982. Two nights before, Yoko Ono and Sean Lennon had come out on stage to embrace John after he played his tribute to the late John Lennon, Empty Garden, for the first time in New York City since the musician’s death.

After an opening set by Geffen label-mates Quarterflash, John and the band typically played a 23-song set, with such seldom-played tunes as "Where Have All The Good Times Gone?", "Ball And Chain" and "Teacher I Need You", before encoring with a "Whole Lotta Shakin’ Going On"/"I Saw Her Standing There"/"Twist and Shout" medley.

Following a three-month break, during which the band recorded the album Too Low for Zero in Montserrat, the tour resumed in Newcastle upon Tyne, England, on 2 November 1982.

The next 43 shows took place throughout the United Kingdom, and the year ended on 24 December, with a run of 16 consecutive nights at the Hammersmith Odeon in London. The December 15 show proved unique in that it was played without a drummer; Nigel Olsson was unable to perform that evening. The show on Christmas Eve featured an appearance by Kiki Dee on "Don't Go Breaking My Heart" and the encores, which included a version of "Jingle Bells".

John and the band’s only performances in 1983 were seven shows that took place at the Sun City casino complex, near Johannesburg, South Africa, from 7-10 October and 12-15 October.

Tour dates

Tour band
Elton John – piano, electric piano (on "Daniel"), lead vocals
Davey Johnstone – guitars, backing vocals
Dee Murray – bass guitar, backing vocals
Nigel Olsson – drums, percussion, backing vocals

Setlists

References

External links

 Information Site with Tour Dates

Elton John concert tours
1982 concert tours